In mathematics, a conical spiral, also known as a conical helix, is a space curve on a right circular cone, whose floor plan is a plane spiral. If the floor plan is a logarithmic spiral, it is called conchospiral (from conch).

Parametric representation 
In the --plane a spiral with parametric representation

 

a third coordinate  can be added such that the space curve lies on the cone with equation  :

 

Such curves are called conical spirals. They were known to Pappos.

Parameter  is the slope of the cone's lines with respect to the --plane.

A conical spiral can instead be seen as the orthogonal projection of the floor plan spiral onto the cone.

Examples

 1) Starting with an archimedean spiral  gives the conical spiral (see diagram)
 
 In this case the conical spiral can be seen as the intersection curve of the cone with a helicoid.
 2) The second diagram shows a conical spiral with a Fermat's spiral  as floor plan.
 3) The third example has a logarithmic spiral   as floor plan. Its special feature is its constant slope (see below).
 Introducing the abbreviation gives the description: .
 4) Example 4 is based on a  hyperbolic spiral . Such a spiral has an asymptote (black line), which is the floor plan of a hyperbola (purple).

Properties 

Slope 

The slope at a point of a conical spiral is the slope of this point's tangent with respect to the --plane. The corresponding angle is its slope angle (see diagram):

 

A spiral with  gives:

 

Because of this property a conchospiral is called an equiangular conical spiral.

Arclength 
The length of an arc of a conical spiral can be determined by

 

For an archimedean spiral the integral can be solved with help of a table of integrals, analogously to the planar case:

 

For a logarithmic spiral the integral can be solved easily:

 

In other cases elliptical integrals occur.

Development 

For the development of a conical spiral the distance  of a curve point  to the cone's apex and the relation between the angle  and the corresponding angle   of the development have to be determined:

 
 

Hence the polar representation of the developed conical spiral is:

 

In case of  the polar representation of the developed curve is

 

which  describes a spiral of the same type.

 If the floor plan of a conical spiral is an archimedean spiral than its development is an archimedean spiral.

 In case of a  hyperbolic spiral the development is congruent to the floor plan spiral.

In case of a  logarithmic spiral  the development is a logarithmic spiral:

Tangent trace 

The collection of intersection points of the tangents of a conical spiral with the --plane (plane through the cone's apex) is called its tangent trace.

For the conical spiral

 

the tangent vector is

 

and the tangent:

 
 
 

The intersection point with the --plane has parameter  and the intersection point is

 

 gives  and the tangent trace is a spiral. In the case  (hyperbolic spiral) the tangent trace degenerates to a circle with radius  (see diagram). For  one has  and the tangent trace is a logarithmic spiral, which is congruent to the floor plan, because of the self-similarity of a logarithmic spiral.

References

External links 

 Jamnitzer-Galerie: 3D-Spiralen..
 

 

Spirals